Cynthia Lowen is the producer and writer of the 2011 documentary film Bully and director and producer of the 2018 documentary film Netizens.

Biography
Lowen grew up in Amherst, Massachusetts and graduated from Colorado College in Colorado Springs, Colorado in 2001. In 2006, she graduated from Sarah Lawrence College in Yonkers, New York with an MFA.

Her writing has appeared in the Black Warrior Review, and in The Laurel Review.

Awards
 2008 Campbell's Corner Poetry Award
 “Discovery”/Boston Review Poetry Prize
 Inkwell Poetry Competition
 Fine Arts Work Center in Provincetown, Massachusetts, Fellowship

Works
"Corpus I: Uranium"; "Oppenheimer Explains Fission"; "Oppenheimer on the Couch"; "Hibakusha"; "Oppenheimer Admires the Prints of Hokusai"; "Corpus II: Atom"; "Bedding Down with Oppie"; "Proposition"; "Theories of Relativity"; "Morning after Trinity or Oppenheimer Wakes and Remembers the Woman of His Dreams"; "Corpus III: Nucleus"; "Oppenheimer Studies the Art of Surrender"; "Hibakusha"; "Oppenheimer Maps His Coordinates"; "Corpus IV: Proton"; "Oppenheimer Gets Caught in a Blizzard"; "I asked to be held. Tea Ceremony"; "Hibakusha"; "Oppenheimer Finds a Lover or Afternoon at the Shore", Campbell corner
"Principles of Uncertainty", Boston Review, MAY/JUNE 2008

Anthologies

Essays
"A Frequent Winner's Advice", Poets & Writers

References

External links

Year of birth missing (living people)
Living people
Colorado College alumni
Sarah Lawrence College alumni
People from Amherst, Massachusetts
American women poets
American filmmakers
Writers from Massachusetts
21st-century American women